A leadership election for Oath was held on 26 June 2021. Robert Šlachta became first leader of the party.

Background
Oath was founded by Robert Šlachta in early 2021. Constituent meeting along with leadership election was set for 26 June 2021 but was reportedly delayed due to 2021 South Moravia tornado. The election was still held but without ideological discussion. Šlachta was the only candidate.

Voting
120 delegates voted. 110 delegates cast votes to Šlachta who was thus elected.

References

Přísaha leadership elections
Oath leadership election
Single-candidate elections
Indirect elections
Oath leadership election
Oath leadership election